C. lutea may refer to:

 Caesalpinia lutea, a plant with zygomorphic flowers
 Calathea lutea, a prayer plant
 Calea lutea, a New World plant
 Callechelys lutea, a worm eel
 Calligenia lutea, an Asian moth
 Calocera lutea, a jelly fungus
 Calostemma lutea, a perennial plant
 Canna lutea, a garden plant
 Caradrina lutea, a Eurasian moth
 Carex lutea, a sedge endemic to North Carolina
 Cariblatta lutea, a small cockroach
 Castnia lutea, a castniid moth
 Catananche lutea, a plant native to the Mediterranean
 Cautleya lutea, a perennial plant
 Cautor lutea, a sea snail
 Ceresa lutea, a buffalo treehopper
 Ceromya lutea, a tachinid fly
 Chionaspis lutea, a scale insect
 Chrysolina lutea, a leaf beetle
 Ciniflella lutea, a three-clawed spider
 Cladrastis lutea, a deciduous tree
 Cleome lutea, an annual wildflower
 Conaliamorpha lutea, a tumbling flower beetle
 Cordia lutea, a flowering plant
 Corticarina lutea, a minute brown scavenger beetle
 Corydalis lutea, a perennial plant
 Cotyledon lutea, a succulent plant
 Crimora lutea, a sea slug
 Cryptocoryne lutea, a plant endemic to Sri Lanka
 Cudonia lutea, a sac fungus
 Cuphea lutea, a plant native to the Americas
 Cyathocline lutea, a flowering plant
 Cymbiola lutea, a sea snail
 Cyrestis lutea, an Indonesian butterfly